Thomas Robert Young  (born 27 July 2000) is a British Paralympic athlete who competes in sprinting events at international events, he is a Paralympic Games gold medallist, triple European champion and a World silver medalist. He won the gold medal in the men's 100 metres T38 event at the 2020 Summer Paralympics in Tokyo, Japan. He also won the 100 metres mixed class event at the 2021 British Athletics Championships.

Young was appointed Member of the Order of the British Empire (MBE) in the 2022 New Year Honours for services to athletics.

References

2000 births
Living people
People from Croydon
Paralympic athletes of Great Britain
Paralympic gold medalists for Great Britain
British male sprinters
English male sprinters
Medalists at the World Para Athletics Championships
Medalists at the World Para Athletics European Championships
Athletes (track and field) at the 2020 Summer Paralympics
British Athletics Championships winners
Members of the Order of the British Empire